The Archdiocese of Paderborn is an archdiocese of the Latin Church of the Roman Catholic Church in Germany; its seat is Paderborn. It was a diocese from its foundation in 799 until 1802, and again from 1821 until 1930. In 1930, it was promoted to an archdiocese. From 1281 until 1802, the Bishopric of Paderborn (German: Fürstbistum Paderborn) was also a state of the Holy Roman Empire.

History
The diocese of Paderborn was founded in 799 by Pope Leo III. In the early years it was subordinated to the bishop of Würzburg. Since 855 the clergy had the right to elect the bishop. The diocese included the larger part of Lippe, Waldeck, and nearly half of the County of Ravensberg.

History of the bishopric

Restoration and later history

While the bishopric as a state had been permanently dissolved in 1802, the Diocese of Paderborn, originally suffragan to Mainz Archdiocese (till 1805), was recreated by Pope Pius VII as a suffragan to Cologne Archdiocese in 1821. Through the Prussian Concordate, it was promoted to an archdiocese in 1930, heading the new Middle German Ecclesiastical Province; at the same time, Paderborn lost its districts around Erfurt and Heiligenstadt to the Diocese of Fulda, and two small areas to the Archdiocese of Cologne. The dioceses of Hildesheim and Fulda were made its suffragans.

When the Diocese of Essen was created in 1958, Paderborn lost a significant portion of its district to it.

In the 1980s the Campingkirche was founded.

In 1994 Paderborn lost the part of its district located in the former East Germany to its newly created suffragan Diocese of Magdeburg. Also the new Diocese of Erfurt was made subordinate to Paderborn. At the same time, Hildesheim was made subordinate to the Archdiocese of Hamburg.

In the 1990s, the conflict between the Archdiocese and renegade priest Eugen Drewermann made headlines.

The current archbishop is Hans-Josef Becker.

In April 2008 pope Benedict XVI. announced Hubert Berenbrinker as a new auxiliary bishop.

Ordinaries

Bishops to 1321

Prince-Bishops (1321 to 1802)

Archbishops
Franz Egon Freiherr von Fürstenberg † (6 Jan 1789 Succeeded – 1802 Promoted to Archbishop)

Bishops
Franz Egon Freiherr von Fürstenberg † (1821 Demoted to Bishop – 11 Aug 1825 Died)
Friedrich Klemens Freiherr von Ledebur † (10 Nov 1825 Appointed – 30 Aug 1841 Died)
Richard Kornelius Dammers † (27 Nov 1841 Appointed – 11 Oct 1844 Died)
Johann Franz Drepper † (11 Jan 1845 Appointed – 5 Nov 1855 Died)
Konrad Martin † (29 Jan 1856 Appointed – 16 Jul 1879 Died)
Franz Kaspar Drobe † (24 Mar 1882 Appointed – 7 Mar 1891 Died)
Hubert Theophil Simar † (25 Jun 1891 Appointed – 24 Oct 1899 Appointed, Archbishop of Köln {Cologne})
Wilhelm Schneider † (10 May 1900 Appointed – 31 Aug 1909 Died)
Karl Joseph Schulte † (30 Nov 1909 Appointed – 8 Mar 1920 Appointed, Archbishop of Köln {Cologne})
Caspar Klein † (30 Apr 1920 Appointed)

Archbishops
Caspar Klein (1930 Promoted to archbishop – 26 January 1941 Died)
Lorenz Jaeger (29 May 1941 Appointed – 30 June 1973 Retired)
Johannes Joachim Degenhardt (15 March 1974 Appointed – 25 July 2002 Died)
Hans-Josef Becker (3 July 2003 – 1 October 2022)

Auxiliary bishops

Diocese (to 1802)
Johannes Fabri, O.F.M. (1437–1458)
Johannes Schulte, O.S.A. (1455–1466)
Heinrich Vuyst (Wust), O.F.M. (1462–1468)
Johannes Ymminck, O.S.A. (1469–1493)
Johann Welmecher, O.F.M. (1481–1505)
Albert Engel (bishop), O.F.M. (1493–1500)
Johannes Schneider (bishop), O.F.M. (1507–1551)
Nikolaus Arresdorf, O.F.M. Conv. (1592–1620)
Johannes Pelking (Pelcking), O.F.M. Conv. (1619–1642)
Bernhard Frick (1644–1655)
Pantaleon Bruns, O.S.B. (1721–1727)
Winimar Knippschild, O.S.B. (1729–1732)
Meinwerk Kaup, O.S.B. (1733–1745)
Johann Christoph von Crass (1746–1751)
Franz Josef von Gondola, O.S.B. (1752–1761)

Diocese (1821–1830)
Richard Kornelius Dammers (1824–1842) Appointed, Bishop of Paderborn

Archdiocese (1830–present)
Anton Ferdinand Holtgreven (1843–1848)
Joseph Freusberg (1854–1889)
Augustinus Göckel (1890–1912)
Heinrich Hähling von Lanzenauer (1912–1925)
Johannes Hillebrand (1926–1931)
Augustinus Philipp Baumann (1932–1953)
Wilhelm Weskamm (1949–1951)
Friedrich Maria Heinrich Rintelen (1951–1970)
Franz Hengsbach (1953–1957)
Wilhelm Tuschen (1958–1961)
Paul Heinrich Nordhues (1961–1990)
Johannes Joachim Degenhardt (1968–1974) Appointed, Archbishop of Paderborn
Hans-Georg (Johannes) Braun (1970–1973)
Paul Josef Cordes (1975–1975)
Paul-Werner Scheele (1975–1979)
Hubert Berenbrinker (1977–2008)
Hans Leo Drewes (1980–1997)
Paul Consbruch (1980–1999)
Franz-Josef Hermann Bode (1991–1995)
Heinz Josef Algermissen (1996–2001)
Reinhard Marx (1996–2001)
Hans-Josef Becker (1999–2003) Appointed, Archbishop of Paderborn
Karl-Heinz Wiesemann (2002–2007)
Manfred Grothe (2004–2015)
Matthias König (2004– )
Hubert Berenbrinker (2008-2020)
Dominicus (Michael) Meier, O.S.B. (2015– )

Structure
The archdiocese is allocated in 19 districts (Dekanate).

References

External links

Official website

Paderborn
799 establishments
Dioceses established in the 8th century
8th-century establishments in Germany
Roman Catholic ecclesiastical provinces in Germany